Palestinian self-determination refers to aspirations by some Palestinians and Palestinian nationalists for increased autonomy and sovereign independence as well as to the international right of self-determination applied to Palestine. Such sentiments are features of both the one state solution and the two state solution. In the two state solution this usually denotes territorial integrity initiatives, such as resisting occupation in the West Bank, annexation efforts in East Jerusalem or freedom of movement along borders as well the preservation of important sites such as al-Aqsa mosque.

Overview
Examples of modern Palestinian politicians who are proponents of Palestinian self-determination include Saeb Erekat. In the one state solution, Palestinian self-determination usually takes the form of calls for Palestinian reunification, which would include a reversal of the 1948 UN decision for the partition of Palestine. Some Palestinian proponents of self-determination such as Edward Said have drawn an analogy between Zionism and colonialism. Other proponents of Palestinian self-determination such as Jamil Effarah have made an analogy between the conditions in the Palestinian territories and the Bantustan land-reserves in apartheid era South Africa.

See also
 Thawabit
 State of Palestine

References

Palestinian politics
Two-state solution
International law
Palestinian nationalism
Sovereignty
Arab separatism